Georgiana Marion Craik (April 1831 – 1 November 1895) was a British writer.

The daughter of George Lillie Craik and Jeanette Dempster, she was born in Old Brompton, London. She began writing for Household Words, possibly as early as 1851. Her first novel Riverston was published in 1857. Her novels were targeted at young women; she also wrote some books for young readers.

In 1886, she married Allan Walter May, an artist.

Craik died in St Leonards-on-Sea at the age of 64.

Selected work 
 Lost and Won novel (1859)
 My First Journal (1860)
 Faith Unwin's Ordeal 2 volumes (1865)
 The Cousin from India (1871)
 Dorcas 3 volumes (1879)
 Two Women 3 volumes (1880)
 Godfrey Helstone 3 volumes (1884)
 Patience Holt 3 volumes (1891)

References 

1831 births
1895 deaths
English women novelists
Victorian novelists
Writers from London
19th-century women writers